The Great America Rifle Conference (GARC) is a National Collegiate Athletic Association (NCAA) rifle-only conference. The GARC was established for schools that sponsor rifle teams, but do not have rifle sponsored in their respective conferences.

Members

Current members

Former members
 Jacksonville State Gamecocks (Left in 2003 when it joined the rifle-sponsoring Ohio Valley Conference)
 Nebraska (Left in 2021, joined the Patriot Rifle Conference)
 Xavier Musketeers (Left in 2005, Dropped the sport)

Champions

GARC championships
Source:

NCAA Championships
Source:
 Army – 2005
 Kentucky – 2011, 2018, 2021
 West Virginia (19) – 1983, 1984, 1986, 1988–93, 1995–98, 2009, 2013–17

See also
List of NCAA rifle programs
NCAA Rifle Championship

References

External links